This list of tallest buildings in Lahore, ranks skyscrapers located in the city of Lahore.

Completed buildings

Under construction

Many skyscrapers and around 150 high-rise buildings were being constructed under the Lahore Development Authority (LDA) in Lahore.

See also
 List of tallest buildings in Islamabad
 List of tallest buildings in Pakistan
 List of tallest buildings and structures in South Asia

References 
   22 . https://progency.pk/